Zygmunt Otto (27 July 1896 – 22 June 1961) was a Polish footballer. He played in one match for the Poland national football team in 1924.

References

External links
 

1896 births
1961 deaths
Polish footballers
Poland international footballers
Place of birth missing
Association footballers not categorized by position